David Darrell Hunter (born September 19, 1989) is a former American football defensive tackle.

College career
Hunter played college at Houston.

Houston Texans
Hunter signed with the Houston Texans as an undrafted free agent on May 14, 2012. He was added to the 53-man roster on October 16, 2012, but did not play due to a toe injury experienced in practice. He returned to the Texans for training camp in 2013; he was later released. Hunter signed with the Tampa Bay Buccaneers on January 6, 2014, but before seeing any action with Tampa Bay returned to his former team, signing with the Texans on July 24, 2014. The Texans released Hunter on August 25, 2015.

References

1989 births
Living people
American football defensive tackles
Houston Texans players
Tampa Bay Buccaneers players
Players of American football from Texas